Decodon may refer to:
 Decodon (fish), a fish genus in the family Labridae
 Decodon (plant), a plant genus in the family Lythraceae